SSR180711 is a drug that acts as a potent and selective partial agonist for the α7 subtype of neural nicotinic acetylcholine receptors. In animal studies, it shows nootropic effects and may be useful in the treatment of schizophrenia.

References 

Nicotinic agonists
Stimulants
Nootropics
Organobromides
Carbamates
Nitrogen heterocycles